Lawrence Folsom Vorhis (1888 – December 1, 1918) was an American football player and coach.  He played college football for the Penn State from 1906 to 1909 and was selected as a first-team All-American in 1909.  Vorhis served as the head football coach at Wesleyan University from 1910 to 1911, compiling a record of 8–8–2.

Athlete
Vorhis played football for Penn State from 1906 to 1909.  He was the team's quarterback and also handled drop kicking responsibilities.  He was selected as a first-team All-American in 1909 by the New York Herald (as an end), New York Mail (as a quarterback), William B. Hanna in the New York Sun, the Philadelphia Press (as a quarterback) and the Philadelphia Public Ledger.

Coach
After graduating from Penn State, Vorhis served as the head football coach at Wesleyan University in 1910 and 1911.  In his two seasons as Wesleyan's head football coach, Vorhis compiled a record of 8–8–2.  In December 1911, Vorhis announced that he would not return to Wesleyan in 1912.  He stated that he intended to operate a sugar plantation in Alabama.

Death
Vorhis died on December 1, 1918, in Wilkes-Barre, Pennsylvania, following a short illness.

Head coaching record

References

External links
 

1888 births
1918 deaths
American football quarterbacks
Penn State Nittany Lions football players
Wesleyan Cardinals football coaches